American R&B singer 6lack has released two studio albums, one extended play, and 29 singles. His released his debut studio album, Free 6lack in November 2016, which featured the single "Prblms". In September 2018, 6lack released his second album, East Atlanta Love Letter, which debuted at number three on the Billboard 200 chart. His third album, Since I Have a Lover, is set to release on March 24, 2023.

Albums

Studio albums

Extended plays

Singles

As lead artist

As featured artist

Other charted and certified songs

Guest appearances

Notes

References

External links
 
 

Contemporary R&B discographies
Discographies of American artists